Elana may refer to:
 ELANA, excimer laser-assisted nonocclusive anastomosis, a type of bypass surgery
 ELaNa: Educational Launch of Nanosatellites, the CubeSat launch program managed by NASA's Launch Services Program
 Elana Toruń, a Polish football club
 Elana, West Virginia

People
 Elana K. Arnold, American children's and young adult author who wrote What Girls Are Made Of
 Elana Bell (born 1977), American poet
 Elana Dykewomon (born 1949), American lesbian activist and author
 Elana Eden (born 1940), Israeli actress
 Elana Greenfield, American playwright
 Elana Herzog (born 1954), American installation artist
 Elana Hill (born 1988), Zimbabwean rower
 Elana James (born 1970) American singer and songwriter
 Elana Johnson (born 1950), American young adult author, known for her Possession series
 Elana Mann (born 1982), American artist
 Elana Meyer (born 1966), South African runner
 Elana Meyers (born 1984), American bobsledder 
 Elana Stone (born 1980), Australian singer
 Elana Maryles Sztokman (born 1969), American sociologist
 Elana Wills (born 1962), American State Supreme Court justice

See also 
 Elena (disambiguation)